is a Japanese freelance creator and former idol who is formerly associated with the girl group AKB48 and later transferred to its sister group SKE48. In 2016, she starred in a live-action film based on Sanami Suzuki's manga adaptation of The Little Match Girl.

Career 

Satō was a finalist in Morning Musume's Happy 8 Ki Audition.

She joined AKB48 on December 20, 2008 as a seventh-generation member of its Kenkyusei (trainees). Her first participation in an AKB48 single was on the B-side track of "River" called "Kimi no Koto ga Suki Dakara" where she performed in the grouping Under Girls.

She was promoted to full member in AKB48.

On August 20, 2009, she took part in the AKB48 election and nationwide tour. On December 7, 2009, she joined Horipro.
Her first A-side single for the group was "Chance no Junban".
On May 21, 2010, she was promoted to Team B during Team shuffle.

On August 24, 2012, she was shuffled to become a member of Team A.

On April 25, 2014, she was transferred to SKE48's Team E.

She graduated from SKE48 Team E on January 7, 2018. She retired from the entertainment industry afterward. On June of the same year, she became a freelance creator.

She announced her marriage to kickboxer Ryo Aitaka and pregnancy on January 1, 2021. She gave birth to a baby girl on June 24.

Discography

Singles

AKB48 A-Sides
 Chance no Junban
 Everyday, Kachuusha
 Ue kara Mariko

AKB48 B-Sides
 Kimi no Koto ga Suki Dakara (River)
 Nusumareta Kuchibiru (Ponytail to Chouchou)
 Namida no Seesaw Game (Heavy Rotation)
 Yasai Sisters (Heavy Rotation)
 Boku Dake no value (Beginner)
 Love Jump (Chance no Junban)
 Guuzen no Juujiro (Sakura no Ki ni Narō)
 Yankee Soul (Everyday, Kachuusha)
 Dakishimechaikenai (Flying Get)
 Seishun to Kizukanai Mama (Flying Get)
 Yasai Uranai (Flying Get)
 Kimi no Senaka (Kaze wa Fuiteiru)
 Noel no Yoru (Ue kara Mariko)
 Yobisute Fantasy (Ue kara Mariko)
 New Ship (Give Me Five!)
 Mitsu no Namida (Manatsu no Sounds Good!) 
 Show Fight! (Gingham Check)
 Kodoku na Hoshizora (Uza)

AKB48 albums
 Jibun Rashisa (Kamikyokutachi)
 Wagamama Collection (Koko ni Ita Koto)

Appearances

Concerts 
 Coco Smile Family Concert Volume 2: Legend (8 January 2006)
 End of the Year Thanksgiving: We're going to shuffle AKB! Give your regards to SKE as well (20 December 2008)
 AKB48 Request Hour Set List Best 100 2009 (18 January 2009)
 AKB48 Bunshin no Jutsu Tour (15 August 2009)
 AKB48 Natsu no Saruobasan Matsuri (13 September 2009)
 AKB48 New York concert at Webster Hall (27 September 2009)
 J-Pop Culture Festival, Jakarta (February 2012)

Musicals 
 Coco Smile 3: Nijiiro no Melody (18–22 August 2004)
 Coco Smile 4: Kinsei no Stage (24–28 August 2005)
 Happa no Freddie Inochi no Tabi (July 2006 - August 2006)
 Happa no Freddie Inochi no Tabi (July 2007 - August 2007)
 Coco Smile 4: Kinsei no Stage  (14 August 2008 - 19 August 2008)
 Peter Pan - Wendy Darling (2012-2015)

Drama 
 Majisuka Gakuen ( Short moment in the last ep)
 Majisuka Gakuen 2 (April 15 - July 1, 2011, as Sanshoku)

Anime 
 AKB0048 (April 29, 2012 - July 22, 2012) as Mimori Kishida.
 AKB0048 Next Stage (January 4, 2013 - March 30, 2013) As Mimori Kishida/Shinoda Mariko The 8th.

 Movies 
 Ultraman Saga (24 March 2012, as Lisa)
 The Little Match Girl''

References

External links 

 
 
 

Living people
AKB48 members
SKE48 members
Japanese women pop singers
Japanese idols
Japanese child actresses
Actors from Saitama Prefecture
Musicians from Saitama Prefecture
21st-century Japanese women singers
21st-century Japanese singers
21st-century Japanese actresses
1993 births